Meenakshi Thiruvilaiyadal is a 1989 Indian Tamil-language Hindu mythological film directed by K. Shankar and produced by N. S. Murty. The film stars Radha and Vijayakanth, with M. N. Nambiar and Sirkazhi G. Sivachidambaram in supporting roles. It was released on 1 December 1989.

Plot 
Goddess Parvati, on the instructions of Lord Shiva, visits Earth to fulfill her obligation towards Queen Kanchanamalai, one of her devotees.

Cast 
Radha as Meenakshi / Taḍādakai / Parvati
Vijayakanth as Shiva / Lord Sundareswar
M. N. Nambiar
Sirkazhi G. Sivachidambaram as Agathiyar
Delhi Ganesh
Nagesh as Poojari
Jai Ganesh as King Malayadhawaja Pandian
Senthil as Kundotharan
Shanmugasundaram as Lord Indra
Sonia as Kokila
R. S. Manohar
Sumithra as Queen Kanchanamalai
Ramya Krishnan as Urvashi
Manorama
Captain Raju as Yatchan
K. R. Vijaya as Arunthathi
Usilai Mani as Chef
Ennathe Kannaiah as Chef

Soundtrack 
The music was composed by M. S. Viswanathan.
"Meenakshi Kalyanam"
"Angayarkanni"
"Madhura Ponnukku"
"Perunthe Inaikkum"

References

External links 
 

1980s Tamil-language films
1989 films
Films directed by K. Shankar
Films scored by M. S. Viswanathan
Hindu mythological films